Prunus erioclada is a species of wild almond native to Iran and Afghanistan. It is a thorny shrub 0.2 to 1.2m tall. It is morphologically similar to Prunus lycioides, P. spinosissima, P. eburnea and P. brahuica. It can be distinguished from the similar species by having its one year old twigs densely covered by a white pubescence, termed white tomentose, and the older twigs grayish-white tomentose. A genetic and morphological analysis shows that it is a good species, with its closest relative being Prunus eburnea.

References

erioclada
Flora of Iran
Flora of Afghanistan
Plants described in 1940
Taxa named by Joseph Friedrich Nicolaus Bornmüller